Hendrik Adriaan Christiaan Dekker (1836, Amsterdam – 1905, Rheden) was a 19th-century Dutch painter and lithographer.

Biography
Dekker was a pupil of Charles Rochussen for painting and Johann Wilhelm Kaiser for engraving at the Rijksakademie van beeldende kunsten in Amsterdam. He was a member of the Pulchri studio and called himself Hein, but signed his works HAC Dekker. He made lithographs after Jozef Israëls.

References

Hendrik Adriaan Christiaan Dekker on Artnet

1836 births
1905 deaths
Painters from Amsterdam
19th-century Dutch painters
Dutch male painters
19th-century Dutch male artists